Juan Manuel Fócil Pérez (born 12 June 1963) is a Mexican politician affiliated with the National Regeneration Movement. As of 2013 he served as Deputy of the LXII Legislature of the Mexican Congress representing Tabasco. Since September 2018 he serves as a Senator in the Senate of the Republic (Mexico), representing the state of Tabasco.

References

1963 births
Living people
People from Villahermosa
Members of the Chamber of Deputies (Mexico) for Tabasco
Members of the Senate of the Republic (Mexico) for Tabasco
Deputies of the LXII Legislature of Mexico
Senators of the LXIV and LXV Legislatures of Mexico
Party of the Democratic Revolution politicians
Politicians from Tabasco
21st-century Mexican politicians
Monterrey Institute of Technology and Higher Education alumni
Morena (political party) politicians